Sofradir is a B2B company with headquarters in Châtenay-Malabry, France that designs and manufactures infrared (IR) detectors for military, space and commercial applications. The company’s shareholders are Thales, Sagem and Areva. Sofradir designs and manufactures cooled IR detector products that are based on Mercury Cadmium Telluride materials (abbreviated as HgCdTe or MCT). MCT is considered a very high performance infrared technology. Sofradir also produces other detector technologies, including quantum well infrared photodetectors (QWIP) and uncooled microbolometer detectors.

In July 2019, Sofradir and ULIS merged to become LYNRED with headquarters in Palaiseau, France. The Lynred workforce numbers 1,000 and the company is focused on seven markets: defense, space, security and surveillance, industry, smart buildings, and automotive.

Sofradir’s MCT IR detectors are being used by space agencies to observe deep space, observe the Earth, monitor the environment, and provide data on meteorological phenomena. Other Sofradir detectors are being used in thermal infrared cameras, missile seekers, research and development as well as surveillance and targeting equipment.

History

Sofradir was established in 1986 by Thales, Sagem and CEA-LETI. The goal of establishing Sofradir was to create an organization that developed and produced IR detectors based on the focal plane array (FPA) technology developed at CEA/LETI. The Infrared Laboratory (Laboratoire InfraRouge) located within the public research institute at CEA/LETI located in Grenoble, France was established to perform research in order to develop future generations of FPAs. Sofradir was to bring these new generations of IR detectors to mature production levels.

Sofradir headquarters are located in Chatenay-Malabry (near Paris) while the development and production facilities are located in Veurey-Voroize near Grenoble. These facilities first became operational by October 1987 with MCT technologies transferred to it from the CEA/LETI infrared laboratories.

Sofradir was initially headed by Jean Louis Teszner  from 1986 until end of 2000. Because of Teszner's significant experience, Sofradir quickly became the largest producer of MCT products in Europe due primarily to the research transferred to it from CEA/LETI. Low rate initial production of certain infrared detectors began in 1991, with mass production beginning in 1994. In parallel, the first space program (HELIOS II) also began in 1994, launching space activity at Sofradir.

In 2000, Sofradir was headed by Philippe Bensussan as chairman and CEO. Sofradir continued its development and production with second generation (TDI scanning) and third generation (staring) infrared detectors as well as others. The company also participated in the production of high performance infrared common modules (SADA II) for the US Army as well as 2D staring arrays mainly for use with missiles.

At the beginning of 2000, Sofradir began delivering QWIP detectors in cooperation with Thales Research and Technologies (TRT) and uncooled products based on the microbolometers technology which had been developed at CEA-LETI. Following these first deliveries, ULIS (a subsidiary of Sofradir at 85%) was established. (General Electric owns the remaining 15% of ULIS).

Sofradir continued to increase the size of its facilities, in 2008 increasing the area by 50% including a 70% increase in area for clean rooms. In December 2008, Sofradir acquired Electrophysics Corp., renamed Sofradir EC, Inc., in Fairfield NJ USA. The acquisition was expected to accelerate the development of Sofradir and its subsidiary ULIS in the North American market.

Accomplishments
Sofradir pioneered the development of second- and third-generation IR detectors. It was one of the first to produce second-generation IR detectors. Second-generation IR detectors have a high level of sophistication because they require the integration of readout electronics on the Focal Plane Array (FPA) as well as signal processing. Sofradir was the first European IR detector manufacturer to have achieved space-deployed products, which are currently in orbit on Venus Express. Sofradir continues to produce highly specialized products such as those used in space applications  In addition, Sofradir also produces infrared detector arrays for high volume production contracts.

Sofradir is also advancing the development of third-generation IR detectors made from MCT layers using the Molecular Beam Epitaxy (MBE) techniques. The MBE technique enables the development of a new class of IR detectors including dual-band and avalanche photodiode detector (APD).

References

External links
Lynred website
 Lynred USA subsidiary website

Manufacturing companies of France
Infrared sensor materials